Cychrus cavazzutti is a species of ground beetle in the subfamily of Carabinae. It was described by Deuve in 2001.

References

cavazzutti
Beetles described in 2001